The Morris Hills are a scattered group of hills  northeast of Petersen Peak, in the La Grange Nunataks of the north-central Shackleton Range, Antarctica. They were first mapped in 1957 by the Commonwealth Trans-Antarctic Expedition (CTAE), and photographed in 1967 by the U.S. Navy (trimetrogon aerial photography). The hills were named by the UK Antarctic Place-Names Committee for Leslie F. Morris, a member of the Royal Society International Geophysical Year Expedition at Brunt Ice Shelf, who in 1957 spent several weeks helping with the final preparations for the CTAE transpolar journey.

References

Hills of Coats Land